Dutch Lake is a lake located in the state of Minnesota. It was named for its early German population. It is a  acre lake that is west-southwest of Minneapolis-St. Paul in the Minneapolis suburb of Mound and Minnetrista. Slow Creek, its un-navigable outflow is on its northeast shore. It connects the lake to Lake Minnetonka. It is home to a variety of fish including Black, Yellow, and Brown Bullhead, Black Crappie, Bluegill, Hybrid Sunfish, Largemouth Bass, Northern Pike, Pumpkinseed Sunfish, and Yellow Perch. Much of the Northern shore is owned by Camp Christmas Tree summer day camp.

References

External links

Lakes of Hennepin County, Minnesota
German-American culture in Minnesota
Lakes of Minnesota